The 1985–86 Utah Jazz season saw the Jazz draft Karl Malone. This marked the beginning of the Stockton and Malone era.

Draft picks

Roster

Regular season

Season standings

Record vs. opponents

Game log

Regular season

|- align="center" bgcolor="#ffcccc"
| 1
| October 25, 1985
| Houston
| L 108–112
|
|
|
| Salt Palace Acord Arena
| 0–1
|- align="center" bgcolor="#ffcccc"
| 2
| October 29, 1985
| @ San Antonio
| L 112–124
|
|
|
| HemisFair Arena
| 0–2
|- align="center" bgcolor="#ccffcc"
| 3
| October 30, 1985
| San Antonio
| W 102–100
|
|
|
| Salt Palace Acord Arena
| 1–2

|- align="center" bgcolor="#ccffcc"
| 4
| November 1, 1985
| Phoenix
| W 121–110
|
|
|
| Salt Palace Acord Arena
| 2–2
|- align="center" bgcolor="#ffcccc"
| 5
| November 2, 1985
| @ Portland
| L 108–128
|
|
|
| Memorial Coliseum
| 2–3
|- align="center" bgcolor="#ccffcc"
| 6
| November 5, 1985
| Golden State
| W 118–99
|
|
|
| Salt Palace Acord Arena
| 3–3
|- align="center" bgcolor="#ffcccc"
| 7
| November 7, 1985
| L.A. Lakers
| L 106–116
|
|
|
| Salt Palace Acord Arena
| 3–4
|- align="center" bgcolor="#ccffcc"
| 8
| November 9, 1985
| Cleveland
| W 121–114
|
|
|
| Salt Palace Acord Arena
| 4–4
|- align="center" bgcolor="#ffcccc"
| 9
| November 12, 1985
| @ L.A. Lakers
| L 110–119
|
|
|
| The Forum
| 4–5
|- align="center" bgcolor="#ffcccc"
| 10
| November 13, 1985
| Dallas
| L 100–115
|
|
|
| Salt Palace Acord Arena
| 4–6
|- align="center" bgcolor="#ccffcc"
| 11
| November 15, 1985
| Portland
| W 133–118
|
|
|
| Salt Palace Acord Arena
| 5–6
|- align="center" bgcolor="#ccffcc"
| 12
| November 16, 1985
| @ Sacramento
| W 100–96
|
|
|
| ARCO Arena
| 6–6
|- align="center" bgcolor="#ffcccc"
| 13
| November 20, 1985
| @ Boston
| L 106–115 (OT)
|
|
|
| Boston Garden
| 6–7
|- align="center" bgcolor="#ccffcc"
| 14
| November 22, 1985
| @ Cleveland
| W 121–113
|
|
|
| Richfield Coliseum
| 7–7
|- align="center" bgcolor="#ccffcc"
| 15
| November 23, 19855:30p.m. MST
| @ Atlanta
| W 116–106
| Dantley (41)
| Eaton, Malone (10)
| Green (6)
| The Omni6,115
| 8–7
|- align="center" bgcolor="#ccffcc"
| 16
| November 25, 1985
| @ Indiana
| W 102–101
|
|
|
| Market Square Arena
| 9–7
|- align="center" bgcolor="#ccffcc"
| 17
| November 27, 1985
| Chicago
| W 114–96
|
|
|
| Salt Palace Acord Arena
| 10–7
|- align="center" bgcolor="#ffcccc"
| 18
| November 29, 1985
| Denver
| L 114–129
|
|
|
| Salt Palace Acord Arena
| 10–8
|- align="center" bgcolor="#ccffcc"
| 19
| November 30, 1985
| @ Golden State
| W 89–88
|
|
|
| Oakland-Alameda County Coliseum Arena
| 11–8

|- align="center" bgcolor="#ccffcc"
| 20
| December 2, 1985
| Golden State
| W 103–100
|
|
|
| Salt Palace Acord Arena
| 12–8
|- align="center" bgcolor="#ffcccc"
| 21
| December 4, 1985
| L.A. Lakers
| L 127–131 (OT)
|
|
|
| Salt Palace Acord Arena
| 12–9
|- align="center" bgcolor="#ffcccc"
| 22
| December 6, 1985
| @ Phoenix
| L 92–111
|
|
|
| Arizona Veterans Memorial Coliseum
| 12–10
|- align="center" bgcolor="#ccffcc"
| 23
| December 7, 1985
| @ L.A. Clippers
| W 131–91
|
|
|
| Los Angeles Memorial Sports Arena
| 13–10
|- align="center" bgcolor="#ffcccc"
| 24
| December 10, 1985
| @ Houston
| L 105–134
|
|
|
| The Summit
| 13–11
|- align="center" bgcolor="#ccffcc"
| 25
| December 11, 1985
| Portland
| W 119–111
|
|
|
| Salt Palace Acord Arena
| 14–11
|- align="center" bgcolor="#ccffcc"
| 26
| December 14, 1985
| Houston
| W 114–100
|
|
|
| Salt Palace Acord Arena
| 15–11
|- align="center" bgcolor="#ccffcc"
| 27
| December 17, 1985
| @ Washington
| W 106–98
|
|
|
| Capital Centre
| 16–11
|- align="center" bgcolor="#ffcccc"
| 28
| December 18, 1985
| @ New Jersey
| L 98–113
|
|
|
| Brendan Byrne Arena
| 16–12
|- align="center" bgcolor="#ffcccc"
| 29
| December 20, 1985
| @ Philadelphia
| L 105–112
|
|
|
| The Spectrum
| 16–13
|- align="center" bgcolor="#ffcccc"
| 30
| December 21, 1985
| @ Chicago
| L 104–117
|
|
|
| Chicago Stadium
| 16–14
|- align="center" bgcolor="#ffcccc"
| 31
| December 26, 1985
| @ Houston
| L 99–106
|
|
|
| The Summit
| 16–15
|- align="center" bgcolor="#ffcccc"
| 32
| December 28, 1985
| Boston
| L 108–110
|
|
|
| Salt Palace Acord Arena
| 16–16
|- align="center" bgcolor="#ccffcc"
| 33
| December 30, 1985
| Seattle
| W 107–105
|
|
|
| Salt Palace Acord Arena
| 17–16

|- align="center" bgcolor="#ffcccc"
| 34
| January 3, 1986
| @ L.A. Lakers
| L 101–110
|
|
|
| The Forum
| 17–17
|- align="center" bgcolor="#ffcccc"
| 35
| January 4, 1986
| @ Dallas
| L 106–119
|
|
|
| Reunion Arena
| 17–18
|- align="center" bgcolor="#ffcccc"
| 36
| January 7, 1986
| @ Seattle
| L 84–91
|
|
|
| Seattle Center Coliseum
| 17–19
|- align="center" bgcolor="#ffcccc"
| 37
| January 9, 1986
| Washington
| L 89–95
|
|
|
| Salt Palace Acord Arena
| 17–20
|- align="center" bgcolor="#ffcccc"
| 38
| January 11, 1986
| @ Denver
| L 106–114
|
|
|
| McNichols Sports Arena
| 17–21
|- align="center" bgcolor="#ccffcc"
| 39
| January 12, 1986
| @ San Antonio
| W 106–102
|
|
|
| HemisFair Arena
| 18–21
|- align="center" bgcolor="#ccffcc"
| 40
| January 14, 1986
| @ Houston
| W 105–102
|
|
|
| The Summit
| 19–21
|- align="center" bgcolor="#ffcccc"
| 41
| January 15, 1986
| @ Golden State
| L 104–150
|
|
|
| Oakland-Alameda County Coliseum Arena
| 19–22
|- align="center" bgcolor="#ccffcc"
| 42
| January 17, 1986
| Dallas
| W 139–112
|
|
|
| Salt Palace Acord Arena
| 20–22
|- align="center" bgcolor="#ffcccc"
| 43
| January 18, 1986
| @ L.A. Clippers
| L 97–131
|
|
|
| Los Angeles Memorial Sports Arena
| 20–23
|- align="center" bgcolor="#ccffcc"
| 44
| January 21, 1986
| Denver
| W 117–114 (OT)
|
|
|
| Salt Palace Acord Arena
| 21–23
|- align="center" bgcolor="#ffcccc"
| 45
| January 23, 1986
| New Jersey
| L 105–106
|
|
|
| Salt Palace Acord Arena
| 21–24
|- align="center" bgcolor="#ccffcc"
| 46
| January 25, 1986
| L.A. Clippers
| W 130–90
|
|
|
| Salt Palace Acord Arena
| 22–24
|- align="center" bgcolor="#ffcccc"
| 47
| January 27, 1986
| Milwaukee
| L 103–127
|
|
|
| Salt Palace Acord Arena
| 22–25
|- align="center" bgcolor="#ccffcc"
| 48
| January 29, 1986
| Philadelphia
| W 107–86
|
|
|
| Salt Palace Acord Arena
| 23–25
|- align="center" bgcolor="#ccffcc"
| 49
| January 31, 1986
| Sacramento
| W 103–101
|
|
|
| Salt Palace Acord Arena
| 24–25

|- align="center" bgcolor="#ffcccc"
| 50
| February 2, 1986
| @ Dallas
| L 97–100
|
|
|
| Reunion Arena
| 24–26
|- align="center" bgcolor="#ffcccc"
| 51
| February 3, 1986
| San Antonio
| L 104–112
|
|
|
| Salt Palace Acord Arena
| 24–27
|- align="center" bgcolor="#ccffcc"
| 52
| February 6, 1986
| New York
| W 119–101
|
|
|
| Salt Palace Acord Arena
| 25–27
|- align="center"
|colspan="9" bgcolor="#bbcaff"|All-Star Break
|- style="background:#cfc;"
|- bgcolor="#bbffbb"
|- align="center" bgcolor="#ffcccc"
| 53
| February 11, 1986
| @ Seattle
| L 92–105
|
|
|
| Seattle Center Coliseum
| 25–28
|- align="center" bgcolor="#ffcccc"
| 54
| February 13, 1986
| @ Milwaukee
| L 106–113
|
|
|
| MECCA Arena
| 25–29
|- align="center" bgcolor="#ccffcc"
| 55
| February 15, 1986
| @ New York
| W 104–97
|
|
|
| Madison Square Garden
| 26–29
|- align="center" bgcolor="#ffcccc"
| 56
| February 17, 1986
| @ Detroit
| L 96–117
|
|
|
| Pontiac Silverdome
| 26–30
|- align="center" bgcolor="#ccffcc"
| 57
| February 19, 19867:30p.m. MST
| Atlanta
| W 109–105
| Dantley (31)
| Malone (12)
| Green, Malone, Scurry (3)
| Salt Palace Acord Arena12,654
| 27–30
|- align="center" bgcolor="#ccffcc"
| 58
| February 22, 1986
| Phoenix
| W 105–97
|
|
|
| Salt Palace Acord Arena
| 28–30
|- align="center" bgcolor="#ccffcc"
| 59
| February 25, 1986
| Houston
| W 100–97
|
|
|
| Salt Palace Acord Arena
| 29–30
|- align="center" bgcolor="#ccffcc"
| 60
| February 27, 1986
| Indiana
| W 109–92
|
|
|
| Salt Palace Acord Arena
| 30–30

|- align="center" bgcolor="#ccffcc"
| 61
| March 1, 1986
| Sacramento
| W 110–94
|
|
|
| Salt Palace Acord Arena
| 31–30
|- align="center" bgcolor="#ffcccc"
| 62
| March 4, 1986
| @ Sacramento
| L 92–94
|
|
|
| ARCO Arena
| 31–31
|- align="center" bgcolor="#ffcccc"
| 63
| March 5, 1986
| @ L.A. Lakers
| L 84–130
|
|
|
| The Forum
| 31–32
|- align="center" bgcolor="#ccffcc"
| 64
| March 7, 1986
| @ Phoenix
| W 105–103
|
|
|
| Arizona Veterans Memorial Coliseum
| 32–32
|- align="center" bgcolor="#ffcccc"
| 65
| March 8, 1986
| @ Portland
| L 90–104
|
|
|
| Memorial Coliseum
| 32–33
|- align="center" bgcolor="#ffcccc"
| 66
| March 12, 1986
| Golden State
| L 111–118
|
|
|
| Salt Palace Acord Arena
| 32–34
|- align="center" bgcolor="#ccffcc"
| 67
| March 14, 1986
| San Antonio
| W 146–121
|
|
|
| Salt Palace Acord Arena
| 33–34
|- align="center" bgcolor="#ffcccc"
| 68
| March 15, 1986
| @ Dallas
| L 98–108
|
|
|
| Reunion Arena
| 33–35
|- align="center" bgcolor="#ccffcc"
| 69
| March 17, 1986
| Detroit
| W 107–106
|
|
|
| Salt Palace Acord Arena
| 34–35
|- align="center" bgcolor="#ccffcc"
| 70
| March 18, 1986
| @ Seattle
| W 107–104
|
|
|
| Seattle Center Coliseum
| 35–35
|- align="center" bgcolor="#ffcccc"
| 71
| March 20, 1986
| Dallas
| L 107–114
|
|
|
| Salt Palace Acord Arena
| 35–36
|- align="center" bgcolor="#ccffcc"
| 72
| March 22, 1986
| Phoenix
| W 119–109
|
|
|
| Salt Palace Acord Arena
| 36–36
|- align="center" bgcolor="#ccffcc"
| 73
| March 24, 1986
| Seattle
| W 116–108
|
|
|
| Salt Palace Acord Arena
| 37–36
|- align="center" bgcolor="#ccffcc"
| 74
| March 26, 1986
| Denver
| W 116–101
|
|
|
| Salt Palace Acord Arena
| 38–36
|- align="center" bgcolor="#ffcccc"
| 75
| March 28, 1986
| @ Denver
| L 120–128
|
|
|
| McNichols Sports Arena
| 38–37
|- align="center" bgcolor="#ccffcc"
| 76
| March 29, 1986
| @ San Antonio
| W 110–102
|
|
|
| HemisFair Arena
| 39–37

|- align="center" bgcolor="#ffcccc"
| 77
| April 1, 1986
| L.A. Clippers
| L 109–113
|
|
|
| Salt Palace Acord Arena
| 39–38
|- align="center" bgcolor="#ffcccc"
| 78
| April 2, 1986
| @ L.A. Clippers
| L 94–97
|
|
|
| Los Angeles Memorial Sports Arena
| 39–39
|- align="center" bgcolor="#ccffcc"
| 79
| April 5, 1986
| Portland
| W 114–103
|
|
|
| Salt Palace Acord Arena
| 40–39
|- align="center" bgcolor="#ffcccc"
| 80
| April 9, 1986
| Sacramento
| L 108–113
|
|
|
| Salt Palace Acord Arena
| 40–40
|- align="center" bgcolor="#ccffcc"
| 81
| April 10, 1986
| @ Sacramento
| W 119–108
|
|
|
| ARCO Arena
| 41–40
|- align="center" bgcolor="#ccffcc"
| 82
| April 12, 1986
| @ Denver
| W 117–99
|
|
|
| McNichols Sports Arena
| 42–40

Playoffs

|-
|- align="center" bgcolor="#ffcccc"
| 1
| April 18, 1986
| @ Dallas
| L 93–101
| Karl Malone (23)
| Karl Malone (13)
| Rickey Green (12)
| Reunion Arena17,007
| 0–1
|- align="center" bgcolor="#ffcccc"
| 2
| April 20, 1986
| @ Dallas
| L 106–113
| Karl Malone (31)
| Mark Eaton (11)
| Rickey Green (8)
| Reunion Arena17,007
| 0–2
|- align="center" bgcolor="#ccffcc"
| 3
| April 23, 1986
| Dallas
| W 100–98
| Rickey Green (32)
| Thurl Bailey (14)
| Rickey Green (8)
| Salt Palace Acord Arena11,635
| 1–2
|- align="center" bgcolor="#ffcccc"
| 4
| April 25, 1986
| Dallas
| L 113–117
| Thurl Bailey (24)
| Mark Eaton (12)
| Rickey Green (10)
| Salt Palace Acord Arena12,683
| 1–3
|-

Player statistics

Season

Playoffs

Awards and records

Awards
 Mark Eaton, NBA All-Defensive First Team
 Karl Malone, NBA All-Rookie Team 1st Team

Records

Transactions

Trades

Free Agents

Additions

Subtractions

See also
 1985-86 NBA season

References

Utah Jazz seasons
U
Utah Jazz
Utah Jazz